Kaimganj railway station is located in Kaimganj town of Farukhabad district, Uttar Pradesh state, India. It serves Kaimganj town. Its code is KMJ. It has two platforms. Passenger and Express trains halt here.

References

Railway stations in Uttar Pradesh
Railway stations in Farrukhabad district